The Dark Element is a Swedish/Finnish symphonic metal band formed by former Nightwish vocalist Anette Olzon and former Sonata Arctica guitarist Jani Liimatainen.

History
In 2016, Frontiers Records offered Jani Liimatainen to record and publish a new album. Liimatainen had then thought that he was going to work with a female vocalist, because the singers of his previous projects had been men. Frontiers soon informed him that Anette Olzon would be the one. Also included on this album are some new songs from 2004, never used before.

The project was announced on August 29, 2017. The debut self-titled album was released on November 10, 2017, recorded with bassist Jonas Kuhlberg and drummer Jani Hurula (members of Cain's Offering).

The Dark Element gave its first show at the Sweden Rock Festival on June 7, 2018.

Their second album, Songs the Night Sings was released on November 8, 2019, recorded with new drummer Rolf Pilve (Stratovarius).

Members

Current members
 Anette Olzon – lead and backing vocals (2017–present)
 Jani Liimatainen – guitars, keyboards, programming, backing vocals (2017–present)
 Jonas Kuhlberg – bass (2017–present)
 Rolf Pilve – drums (2019–present)

Former members
 Jani "Hurtsi" Hurula – drums (2017–2019)

Discography

Studio albums 

The Dark Element (2017)
Songs the Night Sings (2019)

Singles

 "The Dark Element" (2017)
 "My Sweet Mystery" (2017)
 "Dead to Me" (2017)
 "The Ghost and the Reaper" (2017)
 "Songs the Night Sings" (2019)
 "The Pallbearer Walks Alone" (2019)
 "Not Your Monster" (2019)

References

Musical groups established in 2017
Finnish symphonic metal musical groups
Swedish symphonic metal musical groups